Konstantinos "Kostas" Politis (21 March 1942 – 18 June 2018) was a Greek professional basketball player and coach.

Career as a player

Club career
Politis played with Panathinaikos, and they won 3 Greek League championships, in 1967, 1969, and 1971. In the 1968–69 season, he was a FIBA European Cup Winners' Cup semifinalist.

National team career
Politis also played with the Greece men's national basketball team at the EuroBasket 1961, the EuroBasket 1965, the EuroBasket 1967, and at the 1967 Mediterranean Games.

Career as a coach

Club coaching career
Politis was the head coach of Panathinaikos, and they won 3 Greek League championships (1980, 1981, and 1982), and 2 Greek Cups (1979 and 1982). He was also a 2 time Greek Cup finalist (1989 and 1990) while coaching PAOK.

Politis was the head coach of the FIBA Balkans Selection in 1991. In the 1993–94 season, when he was coaching Panathinaikos, he was a FIBA European League semifinalist, and his team finished in 3rd place at the 1994 FIBA European League Final Four at Tel Aviv. In 1999, Politis was a Greek Cup finalist, while coaching AEK Athens.

National team coaching career
Politis was the head coach of the Greece men's national basketball team that won the gold medal at the EuroBasket 1987. He coached the Greece national team at the EuroBasket 1983, and the 1986 FIBA World Championship.

See also 
 List of FIBA EuroBasket winning head coaches

References

External links
FIBA Profile
FIBA Europe Profile
Hellenic Federation Profile 

1942 births
2018 deaths
AEK B.C. coaches
FIBA EuroBasket-winning coaches
Greece national basketball team coaches
Greek basketball coaches
Greek Basket League players
Greek men's basketball players
Near East B.C. players
P.A.O.K. BC coaches
Panathinaikos B.C. coaches
Panathinaikos B.C. players
Point guards
Basketball players from Athens